Have I Ever Told You is the sixth studio album by FFH. The song "Open Up The Sky" was featured on the WOW Hits album for 2003. The album peaked at #119 on the Billboard 200.

Track listing
"Watching Over Me" (Jeromy Deibler) - 3:05
"Fly Away" (Jeromy Deibler) - 3:59
"We Sing Alleluia" (Jeromy Deibler, Scott Williamson, Todd Young) - 4:25
"Jesus Speaks to Me" (Jeromy Deibler) - 3:14
"Astronaut" (Brad O'Donnell, Matt Kroeker) - 3:44
"Have I Ever Told You" (Jeromy Deibler) - 3:57
"I'm Amazed" (Jeromy Deibler) - 3:37
"Millionaire" (Michael Boggs) - 3:27
"Open Up The Sky" (Jeromy Deibler,  Brian Smith) - 4:01
"Before It Was Said" (Jeromy Deibler,  David Hamilton, Michael Boggs) - 5:28
"You Write the Words" (Jeromy Deibler) - 3:13
"On My Cross" (Jeromy Deibler) - 5:59

Personnel 

FFH
 Michael Boggs – vocals, acoustic guitar (1, 2, 3, 5, 7-10)
 Jennifer Deibler – vocals
 Jeromy Deibler – vocals, acoustic piano (11)
 Brian Smith – vocals, bass (11)

Musicians
 Jeff Roach – keyboards (1, 2, 4, 8)
 Byron Hagan – keyboards (3, 9), Hammond B3 organ (5, 11), acoustic piano (6)
 David Hamilton – Hammond B3 organ (7, 10), programming (7, 12), arrangements (7), acoustic piano (10, 12), string arrangements and conductor (10, 12)
 Jerry McPherson – electric guitars (1, 2, 4, 5, 6, 8, 11), dobro (2), acoustic guitar (4, 6)
 Greg Hagen – electric guitars (3, 9)
 Mark Baldwin – electric guitars (7), gut-string guitar (12)
 David Cleveland – electric guitars (7), acoustic guitar (7)
 Andrew Ramsey – electric guitars (7, 10), acoustic guitar (10)
 Mark Hill – bass (1-6, 8, 9)
 Matt Pierson – bass (7, 10)
 Craig Nelson – bass (12)
 Scott Williamson – drums (1, 2, 4, 6, 8, 11), drum programming (2, 6, 11), percussion (3), tambourine (5, 9), string arrangements (6)
 Steve Brewster – drums (3, 9), drum programming (9)
 Kent Hooper – drum programming (3)
 Miles McPherson – drums (5)
 John Hammond – drums (7, 10), programming (10)
 Eric Darken – percussion (7, 10, 12)
 Jonathan Yudkin – fiddle (7)
 Dave Williamson – string conductor (6, 11), string arrangements (11)
 Carl Gorodetzky – string contractor (6, 10, 11, 12)
 Kyle Hill – music preparation (6, 11)
 Ric Domenico – music preparation (10, 12)
 The Nashville String Machine – strings (6, 10, 11, 12)

Choir on "We Sing Alelulia"
 Jannell Els, Kyle Fenton, Lisa Fenton, Lori Johnson, Tony Johnson, Shane McConnell, Amanda Omartian, Chance Scoggins, Allyson Smith, Kara Tualatai Williamson, Dave Williamson and FFH.

Production 
 Robert Beeson – executive producer, art direction 
 Bob Wohler – executive producer 
 Hank Williams – mastering at MasterMix (Nashville, Tennessee)
 Michelle Pearson – A&R production 
 Scott Hughes – art direction
 Jordyn Thomas – art direction 
 Tim Parker – design 
 Kristin Barlowe – photography 
 Robin Geary – hair, make-up
 Chad Curry – stylist

Tracks 1-6, 8, 9 & 11 
 Scott Williamson – producer, overdub recording, vocal recording, track recording (3, 9)
 Todd Robbins – track recording (1, 2, 4, 5, 6, 8, 11)
 Kent Hooper – Pro Tools editing
 Philip Cooper – assistant engineer, additional Pro Tools engineer
 James Felver – assistant engineer 
 J.C. Monterrosa – assistant engineer 
 Ed Simonton – assistant engineer
 Todd Wells – assistant engineer 
 Bob Williams – additional Pro Tools engineer
 Jerry Yoder – additional Pro Tools engineer
 Tom Laune – mixing (1, 3, 5, 8, 11)
 F. Reid Shippen – mixing (2, 4, 6, 9)
 Dan Shike – mix assistant (2, 4, 6, 9)
 Recorded at The Sound Kitchen (Franklin, Tennessee).
 Vocals and Overdubs recorded at Dark Horse Recording and Classic Recording Studios (Franklin, Tennessee).
 Pro Tools editing at House of Big Studio (Franklin, Tennessee).
 Mixed at Bridgeway Studios (Franklin, Tennessee) and Recording Arts (Nashville, Tennessee).

Tracks 7, 10 & 12 
 David Hamilton – producer, overdub recording, digital editing
 Bill Deaton – track recording, mixing
 Doug Sarrett – string recording
 David Streit – vocal recording, recording assistant
 Aaron Shannon – mix assistant
 Tracks and Vocals recorded at The Bennett House (Franklin, Tennessee).
 Overdubbed and digitally edited at HMP Studio (Brentwood, Tennessee).
 Strings recorded at Ocean Way Recording (Nashville, Tennessee).
 Mixed at Quad Studios (Nashville, Tennessee).

References

External links 
FFH
Essential Records

FFH (band) albums
2001 albums
Essential Records (Christian) albums